Virgin Media More is an Irish television channel from Virgin Media Television. The channel is exclusive to Virgin Media Ireland customers and is not available on other digital television platforms.

The channel focuses on broadcasting first see episodes of Irish and international dramas, documentaries, films and sports.  Some shows will eventually air on Virgin Media's free-to-air channels at a later date. For example, Holding premiered in Ireland on Virgin Media More on 12 April 2022, and started airing on Virgin Media One 5 months later on 12 September 2022.

The channel launched on 12 April 2022.

History
Virgin Media Ireland confirmed it would launch a new channel in spring 2022 exclusive to Virgin Media customers in Ireland.  

The channel replaced Virgin 100 on Virgin Media Ireland channel 100.

On April 11, the day before the channel's launch, Virgin Media Sport ceased operations and the channel's sport content moved to Virgin Media More.

The channel launched on 12 April at 9 pm with the Irish premiere of Holding. However, earlier in the day, the channel broadcast To be announced and This is Virgin Media More.

The channel is voiced by Dave Cronin, who is the sole continuity announcer.

Programming

Holding 
Trigger Point
The Guards: Inside the K 
The Ipcress File
Sports Stories 
Europa League
Love Island USA

References

External links
 

Television stations in Ireland
Television channels and stations established in 2022
Virgin Media More